Ghelari is a commune in Hunedoara County, Transylvania, Romania. It is composed of four villages: Ghelari, Govăjdia (Govasdia), Plop and Ruda.

Govăjdia village is the site of the Govăjdia Blast Furnace.

Natives
 Sandu Florea

See also
Orthodox Church of Ghelar

References

Communes in Hunedoara County
Localities in Transylvania
Mining communities in Romania